Silvia Schenker (born 17 January 1954 in Aarau, the capital of the canton of Aargau, Switzerland) is a Swiss politician.

She joined the National Council of Switzerland (the lower house of the federal assembly) in 2003 and served until 2019. Schenker was a member of the Commission for Social Security and Health (CSSS). She is a member of the Swiss Socialist Party.

Now a national advisor, she lives in Bâle.

References

1954 births
Living people
People from Aarau
Social Democratic Party of Switzerland politicians
Members of the National Council (Switzerland)
Women members of the National Council (Switzerland)
21st-century Swiss women politicians
21st-century Swiss politicians